Christ the King is a parish of the Catholic Church in the city of Nuuk, Greenland. It is the only parish of the Catholic Church in Greenland. The parish uses the Latin rite and is under the jurisdiction of the Roman Catholic Diocese of Copenhagen. Although Catholicism arrived in Greenland around the year 1000, when the first churches were built on the island in the thirteenth century most of the settlers had left the scene or had died. After the Protestant Reformation of the fifteenth century, the activities of the Catholic Church were limited. Most Christianity in Greenland was Danish Lutheran denominations. Today, most of the congregation is made up of foreigners and a small group of locals. In 1980 the Sisters of Jesus established a small convent.

Sunday masses are on 17:00 (5:00 pm) and are followed by a dinner.

See also
Roman Catholicism in Greenland
Hvalsey Church

References

Roman Catholic churches in Greenland
Buildings and structures in Nuuk
Churches in the Roman Catholic Diocese of Copenhagen
Parishes of the Catholic Church